The Excel was a cyclecar manufactured in Detroit, Michigan by the Excel Distributing Company in 1914. It was driven by a friction transmission with belts.

References
 

Defunct motor vehicle manufacturers of the United States
Motor vehicle manufacturers based in Michigan
Cyclecars
Defunct manufacturing companies based in Detroit